José Ramón de la Morena Pozuelo (born 1956 in  Brunete, Madrid) is a Spanish journalist. Holding a bachelor's degree in information science, he is the director and presenter of the radio program El Transistor of the Onda Cero radio network.

Career 
De la Morena began as a journalist at Radio Intercontinental, but in 1981 he moved to the sports department of the Cadena SER, where he covered the football world cup, La Liga tournament, the Tour de France and the Vuelta a España. On 3 September 1989 he began his duties at El Larguero.

Listenership increased, and by the mid-1990s the program overtook its rival, Supergarcía, of the COPE network. It is now the most popular show during the national sports information hour, every night from midnight to 1:30 a.m.

Awards
 Premio Larra (1995)
 Premio Periodista de Radio de la Liga de Fútbol Profesional  (1995)
 Micrófono de Oro (2003, 2011)

Bibliography

References

1956 births
Living people
Spanish reporters and correspondents
Cadena SER